Bryan Moore may refer to:

Sportspeople
Bryan Moore (arena football) for 1991 Orlando Predators season
Bryan Moore (baseball) for Houston Cougars baseball
Bryan Moore (ice hockey) player for Sault Ste. Marie Greyhounds

Others
Bryan Moore (director), actor and director of the film Cool Air
Bryan Moore (screenwriter) on List of That '70s Show episodes
Reverend Bryan Moore of Church of Satan

See also
Brian Moore (disambiguation)